"The Place Where Lost Things Go" is a song from the 2018 film Mary Poppins Returns which was written by Marc Shaiman and Scott Wittman. The song was performed by Emily Blunt as the titular character, while a reprise of the song was performed by Blunt's co-stars Pixie Davies, Nathanael Saleh, and Joel Dawson.

Context and history
The song acts as "the film's central ballad". It is a lullaby in which Mary Poppins (Blunt) tells to the children Annabel (Davies), John (Saleh), and Georgie Banks (Dawson), whose mother died before the events of the film, about "the place where lost things go", and that their mother is there watching over them. Blunt felt that the song's message that "nothing’s gone forever, only out of place" is "so important for the world we’re in right now, with a lot of kids feeling a lot of loss".

Shaiman said that the song's idea of "a place where the lost things go" was something that "stuck in [his and Wittman's] heads" when planning the song. Unlike most songs in the film, the song wasn't re-written by Shaiman and Wittman, as they felt it was "a sure-fire hit from the start". Shaiman and Wittman were inspired for the song's central idea by P. L. Travers' novels that inspired both the film and its predecessor, in which Mary Poppins takes Jane and Michael Banks (who in the film are Annabel, John, and Georgie's father and aunt, respectively) to the Moon, where they meet the Man in the Moon, who tells them that, in the dark side of the Moon, are the things that get lost.

Release
"The Place Where Lost Things Go" was released, along with the rest of the film's soundtrack, on December 7, 2018. On November 26, 2018, a clip from the film featuring Blunt's version of the song was released on Disney's YouTube channel.

Other versions
Shaiman performed the song during an event hosted by Sirius XM. During the 91st Academy Awards, Bette Midler performed the song, with Shaiman performing the song's music on piano.

Accolades

References

Songs from Mary Poppins
2018 songs
2010s ballads
Songs about death
Songs written by Marc Shaiman
Songs written by Scott Wittman
Walt Disney Records singles